Prolez is a village in Shabla Municipality, Dobrich Province, northeastern Bulgaria.

References

Villages in Dobrich Province